Brendan Piakura (born 16 May 2002) is a Cook Islands international rugby league footballer who plays as a  forward for the Brisbane Broncos in the NRL.

Background 
Piakura was born in Newcastle, New South Wales and raised on the Gold Coast, Queensland. He is of Cook Islands descent.

He played his junior rugby league for the Helensvale Hornets and attended Coombabah State High School and Palm Beach Currumbin State High School before being signed by the Brisbane Broncos.

Playing career

Early career
In 2018, Piakura represented the Queensland under-16 team.

In 2019, he played for the Tweed Heads Seagulls in the Mal Meninga Cup, starting at second row in their state and national finals wins. In June 2019, he represented the Queensland under-18 team. In September 2019, he represented the Australian Schoolboys in their 36–20 win over the Junior Kiwis.

2021
Piakura began the season playing for the Norths Devils in the Queensland Cup.

On 15 April, he re-signed with the Brisbane club until the end of the 2024 season.

In Round 24 of the 2021 NRL season, Piakura made his NRL debut for Brisbane in a loss to the Cronulla-Sutherland Sharks. He was sin-binned six minutes into his debut for a late tackle on Cronulla halfback Braydon Trindall, and was later suspended for two games.

Piakura once completing his two match suspension played for Norths Devils in the Queensland cup finals, playing in wins over Tweed Heads Seagulls and Burleigh Bears. Piakura failed a HIA against Burleigh Bears in the preliminary final five minutes into the game and missed the Grand Final win over Wynnum Manly Seagulls the following week as a result of failing the HIA.

2022
Piakura had an injury disrupted season with a calf injury and concussions forcing Piakura to miss games across the year limiting Piakura to one NRL game for the Brisbane Broncos in Round 25 in a 22-12 loss against St George Illawarra Dragons. Piakura played in Norths Devils 16-10 victory over the Redcliffe Dolphins in the 2022 Queensland Cup Grand Final, starting in the second-row.

References

External links 
Brisbane Broncos profile

2002 births
Living people
Australian rugby league players
Australian people of Cook Island descent
Brisbane Broncos players
Cook Islands national rugby league team players
Norths Devils players
Rugby league players from Newcastle, New South Wales
Rugby league second-rows